Bedeva is a genus of sea snails, marine gastropod molluscs in the family Muricidae, the murex snails or rock snails.

Species
Species within the genus Bedeva include:
 Bedeva baileyana (Tenison Woods, 1881)
 Bedeva elongata (Tryon, 1880)
 Bedeva flindersi (A. Adams & Angas, 1864)
 Bedeva paivae (Crosse, 1864)
 Bedeva sumatraensis (Thiele, 1925)
 Bedeva vinosa (Lamarck, 1822)

Species brought into synonymy
 Bedeva birileffi (Lischke, 1871): synonym of Bedevina birileffi (Lischke, 1871)
 Bedeva blosvillei (Deshayes, 1832) : synonym of Lataxiena blosvillei (Deshayes, 1832)
 Bedeva pensa Iredale, 1940: synonym of Bedeva paivae (Crosse, 1864)
 Bedeva texturata Smith, 1904: synonym of Phycothais texturata (E.A. Smith, 1904)
 Bedeva vapida Woolacott, 1957: synonym of Lataxiena blosvillei (Deshayes, 1832)

References

 Marwick J. (1948). Lower Pliocene Mollusca from Otahuhu, Auckland. New Zealand Geological Survey Palaeontological Bulletin. 16: 38 pp., 8 pl.

External links
 Tan K. S. (2003) Phylogenetic analysis and taxonomy of some southern Australian and New Zealand Muricidae (Mollusca: Neogastropoda). Journal of Natural History 37(8): 911-1028
 Barco, A.; Marshall, B.; Houart, R.; Oliverio, M. (2015). Molecular phylogenetics of Haustrinae and Pagodulinae (Neogastropoda: Muricidae) with a focus on New Zealand species. Journal of Molluscan Studies. 81(4): 476-488

 
Haustrinae
Gastropod genera